Easy Programming Language (EPL) is a visual compiled multilingual proprietary programming language. EPL is somewhat popular in China because it features a full Chinese environment. (The language has traditional Chinese, simplified Chinese, English and Japanese variants.)

In addition, it is cross-platform, as it currently supports both Microsoft Windows and Linux. It is object-oriented and structured.

Programming examples
Hello world program:
调试输出("Hello, world!")

References

External links
EPL homepage at archive.org
EPL homepage 

Non-English-based programming languages
Chinese-language computing